Dina Havić (born November 13, 1987) is a Croatian handballer playing for Yenimahalle Bld. SK and the Croatian national team.

She played for RK Lokomotiva Zagreb (2008–2015) in her country before she transferred to the Ankara-based team Yenimahalle Bld. SK to play in the Turkish Women's Handball Super League.

References

1987 births
Handball players from Rijeka
Croatian female handball players
Croatian expatriate sportspeople in Turkey
Expatriate handball players in Turkey
Yenimahalle Bld. SK (women's handball) players
Living people
ŽRK Zamet players
RK Podravka Koprivnica players